Dionatan do Nascimento Teixeira (24 July 1992 – 5 November 2017) was a Brazilian-born Slovakian professional footballer who played as a centre-back.

Teixeira began playing football with local side Londrina EC in Brazil before he was given the opportunity to play in Europe with Slovakian side MFK Košice in 2008. He played in the youth teams at Košice and went on trials with a number of clubs in England. A failure to gain a work permit ended any chances of him joining an English club, and after playing on loan for Slovan Bratislava in 2011–12 he was released by Košice.

After briefly playing amateur football he moved on to Baník Ružiná and then to Slovak Super Liga side Dukla Banská Bystrica. In 2013 Teixeira was granted Slovak citizenship and after impressing Stoke City whilst on trial he joined them on a three-year contract in June 2014. However, he failed to make any impact at Stoke and left in January 2017 and later joined Moldovan side Sheriff Tiraspol.

Career

Early career
Teixeira began his career with local team Londrina EC in his native Brazil. At the age of 16 he decided to move into European football and earned a youth contract with Slovak side MFK Košice. In 2009, Teixeria went on trial with a number of English teams including Middlesbrough, Blackburn Rovers, Newcastle United and Manchester City.

He returned to Košice in April 2009 and made his first team debut on 18 April 2009 against MFK Dubnica. After a lack of opportunity at Košice he went on loan to Slovan Bratislava for the 2011–12 season but spent his time in Bratislava playing in the B team. He left Košice in the summer of 2012 and after spending time playing for local amateur side Slovan Čeľadice he joined 2. Liga side Baník Ružiná. In March 2013 he joined Slovak Super Liga side Dukla Banská Bystrica.

In January 2014, Teixeira had a trial at Reading and at Stoke City in March 2014.

Stoke City
On 11 June 2014, he signed a three-year contract with Stoke City, with Chief Executive Tony Scholes saying — "We have been following Dionatan's progress for some time and we're delighted to have secured his services because there's no doubt he's a talented player with a great deal of potential." Stoke manager Mark Hughes stated that whilst on trial Teixeira reminded him of Ryan Nelsen who played for Hughes at Blackburn Rovers. —"Dionatan came in on trial and I've done that before with the likes of Chris Samba and Ryan Nelsen, who we had the opportunity to bring in at Blackburn. When you can look at players close up you get a better impression of what their capabilities are. We did it with Dionatan and he looked really good".

Teixeira's start to his Stoke City career was hampered after he broke his foot in training which ruled him out for most of the 2014–15 season. He made his Premier League debut for Stoke on 21 February 2015, coming on as a substitute in a 2–1 victory against Aston Villa.

On 3 October 2015, he joined League One side Fleetwood Town on loan. He spent three months with the club making ten appearances before returning to Stoke. Teixeira again featured just once as a substitute for Stoke in 2015–16, away at Bournemouth in February 2016. In May 2016 he had a trial at MLS side Orlando City.

Teixeira's contract with Stoke was terminated in January 2017 after making just two appearances as substitute.

Sheriff Tiraspol
On 17 February 2017, Teixeira signed for Moldovan club Sheriff Tiraspol.

Death
On 5 November 2017, Teixeira suffered a fatal heart attack in Londrina, Brazil.

International career
Teixeira gained a Slovak passport in August 2013. After that he was a regular member of the Slovak U21 team.

Personal life
His younger brother Marcão also became a professional footballer.

Career statistics

Source:

References

External links

1992 births
2017 deaths
Sportspeople from Londrina
Slovak footballers
Slovakia youth international footballers
Brazilian footballers
Brazilian expatriate footballers
Brazilian expatriate sportspeople in England
Association football defenders
Londrina Esporte Clube players
FC VSS Košice players
ŠK Slovan Bratislava players
TJ Baník Ružiná players
FK Dukla Banská Bystrica players
Stoke City F.C. players
Fleetwood Town F.C. players
Slovak Super Liga players
2. Liga (Slovakia) players
Expatriate footballers in Slovakia
Slovak people of Brazilian descent
Slovak expatriate sportspeople in England
Slovak expatriate sportspeople in Moldova
Expatriate footballers in England
Expatriate footballers in Moldova
Brazilian expatriate sportspeople in Slovakia
Premier League players
English Football League players
Moldovan Super Liga players
FC Sheriff Tiraspol players
Naturalized citizens of Slovakia
Naturalised association football players
Brazilian expatriate sportspeople in Moldova